Saifoulaye Diallo (1 July 1923 – 25 September 1981) was a Guinean politician, lawmaker and cabinet member.

Career 
Diallo served in the National Assembly of France from 1956 to 1958. He was the political secretary of the ruling Democratic Party of Guinea and the de facto number-two statesman during the first five years of the Republic of Guinea. He served as President of the Territorial Assembly (March 1957–1958) and President of the National Assembly (1958–1963). In January 1963, he entered the government as Minister of State and held various cabinet portfolios (foreign affairs, economy and finance, social services) under President Ahmed Sékou Touré until his death in 1981.

Books and speeches
 Saifoulaye Diallo. Rapport social : présenté le 27 septembre 1967 au 8e Congrès du P.D.G. Parti démocratique de Guinée. Conakry, Impr. Patrice Lumumba, 1967.
 Hommage à Elhadj Saifoulaye Diallo. Parti-Etat de Guinée. Conakry : Patrice Lumumba, 1981.
 Saifoulaye Diallo. Exposé sur le domaine financier. Parti démocratique de Guinée. Bureau politique national.; Ecole nationale des cadres du parti. Conakry, s.n., 1968
 Réformes de la constitution : différents discours. Saifoulaye Diallo; Charles de Gaulle; Ahmed Sékou Touré. Conakry. Bureau de presse de la Présidence de la République populaire révolutionnaire de Guinée, 1981.
 Discours. Jean Mauberna, Saifoulaye Diallo, Sékou Touré. Conakry, Impr. du gouvernement. Guinée française. Conakry, 1958
 Sidiki Kobélé Keita. Un homme de conviction et de foi : Saïfoulaye Diallo (1923-1981). Conakry : SKK, 2003.

External links
Special section on webGuinée
 1st page on the French National Assembly website
 2nd page on the French national assembly website 
 Biography

1923 births
1981 deaths
Finance ministers of Guinea
Foreign Ministers of Guinea
People from Labé Region
People of French West Africa
Democratic Party of Guinea – African Democratic Rally politicians
Government ministers of Guinea
Deputies of the 3rd National Assembly of the French Fourth Republic
Presidents of the National Assembly (Guinea)
Members of the National Assembly (Guinea)
Guinean diplomats
Grand Crosses 1st class of the Order of Merit of the Federal Republic of Germany